The Boozefighters Motorcycle Club (BFMC) began as an outlaw (i.e. not sanctioned nor chartered by the AMA) motorcycle club, founded in California after the end of World War Two.  The Boozefighters are known as the "Original Wild Ones."

Foundation: Wino Willie Forkner 
Its founder was William Clyde "Wino Willie" Forkner Jr., who had served in the military during World War Two and had a difficult time adjusting to civilian life after the war.  He had been a member of the 13 Rebels Motorcycle Club for two years prior to the attack on Pearl Harbor, and his nickname "Wino Willie" had come about at age 12 because he liked to drink red wine.  During the war he had risen in the ranks of the Army Air Corps and then fallen again as the result of a drunken incident in a bar.  After it ended, he re-joined the 13 Rebels, but in 1946 he had his membership stripped from him by the other members after an incident at a quarter-mile race in San Diego where, bored and drunk, he drove his own motorcycle through a wooden gate onto the racetrack, around the track, and eventually lost control.

Disillusioned, drunk, and angry, one evening he and three other former servicemen were drinking at the All-American Bar in Los Angeles and decided to form a new motorcycle club themselves, taking the name from a shouted suggestion from a fellow bar patron named Walt Porter who overhead their conversation to "Call it the Boozefighters."  The four recruited another 16 members, all also war veterans with one exception (Jim Morrison, a teenager), and applied for AMA membership, with C. B. Clauson, former paratrooper, as the club president.
Forkner later reported that the AMA president declined the application stating that "No goddam way am I giving a name like that to a charter."

The club began to grow, having three chapters (in Los Angeles, San Pedro, and San Francisco), by 1947.  Members of all three attended the Hollister riot that year.  The L.A. chapter got drunk before it even arrived at Hollister, starting out on the Thursday before the weekend by drinking in the All-American Bar, driving to Santa Barbara, drinking there, driving to San Luis Obispo where they were too drunk to drive on that day and decided to sleep in a bus terminal, driving on the next day to King City, buying more alcohol from a liquor store, and then driving on.

Wino Willie was mistakenly arrested at the riot for purportedly inciting a riot and a jailbreak of other bikers who had already been arrested, when in fact he was trying to do the opposite and talk the mob out of staging a jailbreak.

When racing, Wino Willie would sport the colors of another motor cycle club, the Yellow Jackets, rather than Boozefighters colors.

Later years 
The movie The Wild One, which Wino Willie initially consulted on but eventually resigned from over the way that bikers were being portrayed, boosted membership of the club during the 1950s.
Club membership then shrank, as members retired or died during the 1960s, only for its numbers to swell again because of the Vietnam War as it was joined once again by ex-servicemen.
By the 21st century it had grown to become an international organization, with chapters in various European countries, Canada, The Philippines, South Korea and Japan.

Cross-reference

Sources

Further reading 
  288 pages.

Motorcycle clubs in the United States
1946 establishments in California
Organizations based in Fort Worth, Texas